Round Table—Free Georgia was an alliance of political parties led by Zviad Gamsakhurdia. It played decisive role in the restoration of independence of Georgia.

The alliance traces its origins to the Georgian independence movement of the 1980s. On 11–13 March 1990 several Georgian political organizations with the aim of secession from Soviet Union held conference in Tbilisi to create coordinating body for the independence movement. Soon pro-Gamsakhurdia parties established alliance Round Table—Free Georgia, calling for a peaceful transition to independence through participation in the official elections, while others opted to set their own elections for an alternative legislative body, the National Congress. In October 1990 the Round Table—Free Georgia took part in the first multiparty parliamentary elections in Soviet Georgia, receiving 53,99% of the overall votes and gaining majority in the Supreme Council.

The alliance managed to declare independence of Georgia on 9 April 1991. Zviad Gamsakhurdia was elected as a first-ever president of Georgia on 26 May 1991. Soon Georgia was dragged into the civil war between pro- and anti-Gamsakhurdia forces, which Zviad Gamsakhurdia forced to flee in January 1992. The Supreme Council ceased functioning and some of its members took part in the subsequent military actions. In September 1993 the Round Table—Free Georgia members gathered in Zugdidi to re-establish the Supreme Council. After the death of Zviad Gamsakhurdia and defeat in civil war the alliance dissolved.

List of parties
 Georgian Helsinki Group (sakartvelos helsink’is k’avshiri)
  All-Georgian Society of St. Ilia II the Righteous (sruliad sakartvelos ts’minda ilia martlis sazogadoeba)
 All-Georgian Society of Merab Kostava (sruliad sakartvelos merab k’ost’avas sazogadoeba)
 Union of Georgian Traditionalists (kartvel t’raditsionalist’ta k’avshiri)
 Georgian National Front — Radical Union (sakartvelos erovnuli pront’i-radik’aluri k’avshiri)
 Georgian National–Liberal Union (sakartvelos erovnul-liberaluri k’avshiri)
 Georgian Christian–National Party (sakartvelos erovnul-krist’ianuli p’art’ia)

Electoral performance

Parliamentary election

Presidential election

References

1990 establishments in Georgia (country)
Georgian nationalism
National conservative parties
Nationalist parties in Georgia (country)
Political parties established in 1990
Political parties in Georgia (country)
Pro-independence parties in the Soviet Union
Right-wing parties
Social conservative parties